Demba Seck (born 10 February 2001) is a Senegalese professional footballer who plays as a forward for Serie A club Torino and the Senegal national team.

Club career
Seck was raised in the youth system of SPAL and started his senior career in the 2019–20 season in Serie D on loan at Sasso Marconi.

On 31 January 2022, Seck signed with Serie A club Torino.

References

Living people
2001 births
Senegalese footballers
Senegal international footballers
Association football forwards
Serie A players
Serie B players
Serie D players
S.P.A.L. players
Torino F.C. players
Senegalese expatriate footballers
Senegalese expatriate sportspeople in Italy
Expatriate footballers in Italy